| top goal scorer     =  Clint Dempsey  (3 goals)
| prevseason          = 2016
| nextseason          = 2018
}}

The 2017 MLS Cup Playoffs (branded as the 2017 Audi MLS Cup Playoffs for sponsorship reasons) began on October 25, and ended on December 9 with MLS Cup 2017, the 22nd league championship match for MLS. This is the 22nd version of the MLS Cup Playoffs, the tournament culminating the Major League Soccer regular season. Twelve teams, the top six of each conference, compete in the MLS Cup Playoffs.

The first round of each conference has the third-seeded team hosting the sixth seed while the fourth-seed hosts the fifth seed in a single match to determine who advances to the Conference Semifinals. In the Conference Semifinals, the top seed plays the lowest remaining seed while the second plays the next-lowest. The winners advance to the Conference Finals. Both the Conference Semifinals and Conference Finals are played as a two-legged aggregate series. The winners advance to the MLS Cup, a single match hosted by the participant with the better record.

Conference standings
The top six teams from each conference advance to the MLS Cup playoffs. Chicago and Portland won seeding tiebreakers over Atlanta and Seattle, respectively, based on total wins.

Eastern Conference

Western Conference

Bracket

Knockout round

Summary

|-
|colspan="5" bgcolor=#87CEFA align=center|Eastern Conference

|-
|colspan="5" bgcolor=#FFAEB9 align=center|Western Conference

|}

Matches

Conference semifinals

Summary

|-
|colspan="5" bgcolor=#87CEFA|Eastern Conference

|-
|colspan="5" bgcolor=#FFAEB9|Western Conference

|}

Matches

2–2 on aggregate. Toronto FC won on away goals.

Columbus Crew won 4–3 on aggregate.

Seattle Sounders FC won 2–0 on aggregate.

Houston Dynamo won 2–1 on aggregate.

Conference Finals

Summary

|-
|colspan="5" bgcolor=#87CEFA|Eastern Conference

|-
|colspan="5" bgcolor=#FFAEB9|Western Conference

|}

Matches

Toronto FC won 1–0 on aggregate.

Seattle Sounders FC won 5–0 on aggregate.

MLS Cup

Goalscorers

References 

2017 Major League Soccer season
MLS Cup Playoffs
MLS Cup Playoffs
MLS Cup Playoffs
MLS Cup Playoffs